Hoseynabad-e Mahlar-e Olya (also Romanized as Ḩoseynābād-e Mahlār-e ‘Olyā; also known as Ḩoseynābād-e Mohlār-e ‘Olyā) is a village in Doruneh Rural District, Anabad District, Bardaskan County, Razavi Khorasan Province, Iran. At the 2006 census, its population was 121, in 28 families.

References 

Populated places in Bardaskan County